Dubai School of Dental Medicine (DCDM) is a dental medical college located in Dubai, United Arab Emirates. The dental college is accredited by the Ministry of Higher Education. The college was founded in 2013. The college is a newly established home-grown dental institution launched to support the United Arab Emirates (UAE) community with dental care services and education. This college offers both undergraduate and post-graduate degrees.

References

External links 

Universities and colleges in Dubai
Educational institutions established in 2013
2013 establishments in the United Arab Emirates